Kathleen Goligher (born 1898) was an Irish spiritualist medium. Goligher was endorsed by engineer William Jackson Crawford who wrote three books about her mediumship, but was exposed as a fraud by physicist Edmund Edward Fournier d'Albe in 1921.

Investigations

Goligher was born in Belfast. She held séances in her own home with seven of her family members. The psychical researcher and engineer William Jackson Crawford (1881–1920) investigated the mediumship of Goligher and claimed she had levitated the table and produced ectoplasm.

Crawford in his books developed the "Cantilever Theory of Levitation" due to his experiments with Goligher. According to his theory the table was levitated by "psychic rods" of ectoplasm which came out of the body of the medium to operate as an invisible cantilever. Crawford took flashlight photographs of the ectoplasm, and described the substance as "plasma". Crawford investigated Goligher's mediumship at her house for six years. He committed suicide on 30 July 1920 for unknown reasons. Crawford's photographs of Goligher showed that the ectoplasm, frequently issued from her vagina.

There were no scientific controls in the Crawford's séances with Goligher as she and her family members had their hands and legs free at all times. After Crawford's death the physicist Edmund Edward Fournier d'Albe investigated the medium Goligher at twenty sittings and arrived at the opposite conclusion to Crawford. According to d'Albe no ectoplasm or levitation had occurred with Goligher and stated he had found evidence of fraud. On 22 July 1921 he observed Goligher holding the table with her foot. He also discovered that the "ectoplasm" substance in the photographs of Crawford was muslin. During a séance d'Albe had observed white muslin between Goligher's feet.

In a letter to Harry Houdini, d'Albe wrote "I must say I was greatly surprised at Crawford's blindness." The conclusion from d'Albe was that the Goligher family were involved in the mediumship trickery and had duped Crawford. D'Albe published The Goligher Circle in 1922 which exposed the fraudulent mediumship of Goligher and because of the exposure she retired from mediumship in the same year.

Critical evaluation

Crawford's experiments were criticized by scientists for their inadequate controls and lack of precaution against fraud.

Physician Morton Prince in the Journal of Abnormal Psychology noted that Crawford's psychic rod hypothesis "fails to account for much and cannot be reconciled with what is scientifically known as matter, or force, or electricity, or energy."

A review in the Journal of Applied Psychology suggested that Crawford does "not seem to have been able to avoid self-deception, and his experiments are not convincing."

Psychical researcher Hereward Carrington noted that the photographs taken by Crawford look "dubious in appearance" and that "with rare exceptions, no other investigators had an opportunity to check-up his results, since outsiders were rarely admitted to the sittings."

The surgeon Charles Marsh Beadnell published a booklet in 1920 that debunked the experiments. He also offered a cash prize to any medium who could produce a single levitation under controlled conditions.

Bryan Donkin, M.D., studied the Crawford experiments called attention to "the superabundant exposure of the massive credulity and total defect of logical power displayed by Dr. Crawford," who gives "the most pathetic picture of a willing victim of pernicious deception".

Psychologist Joseph Jastrow criticized the Crawford experiments as unscientific and wrote that "the minute detail of apparatus and all the paraphernalia of an engineering experiment which fills the Crawford books must ever remain an amazing document in the story of the metapsychic. As proof of what prepossession can do to a trained mind the case is invaluable."

Joseph McCabe suggested that Goligher had used her feet and toes to levitate the table and move objects in the séance room and compared her fraudulent mediumship to Eusapia Palladino who performed similar tricks. Edward Clodd also dismissed the experiments as fraudulent and noted that Goligher refused invitation to be examined by a group of magicians and scientists.

Researchers such as Ruth Brandon and Mary Roach have heavily criticized Crawford's investigation, describing him as credulous and having a sexual interest in Goligher, such as an obsession with her underwear. Crawford held a deep fixation on underwear, for example psychical researcher Theodore Besterman noted that before his suicide he "spent all his money (consequently leaving nothing) on a stack of woollen underwear for his family, sufficient to last for several years."

In 1988, Susan Blackmore claimed that she had communicated with Dingwall about the case. Blackmore stated that Crawford had confessed to Dingwall that all the Goligher phenomena was fraudulent. Blackmore quotes Crawford as saying "Ding, I have to tell you something. It was all faked, all of it."

See also
Eva Carrière
Mina Crandon

References

Further reading
 Charles Marsh Beadnell. (1920). The Reality or Unreality of Spiritualistic Phenomena: Being a Criticism of Dr. W.J. Crawford's Investigation into Levitations and Raps. Watts & Co. 
William Jackson Crawford. (1921). The Psychic Structures at the Goligher Circle. New York: E. P. Dutton & Company. 
Edmund Edward Fournier d'Albe. (1922). The Goligher Circle. J. M. Watkins.
Joseph Jastrow. (1920). A Psychic Tragedy: The Case of Professor Crawford. The Weekly Review 3: 412–415. 
Martyn Jolly. (2006). Faces of the Living Dead: The Belief in Spirit Photography. Miegunyah Press. 
Joseph McCabe. (1920). [https://archive.org/stream/isspiritualismba00mccarich#page/58/mode/2up Is Spiritualism Based On Fraud? The Evidence Given By Sir A. C. Doyle and Others Drastically Examined]. London Watts & Co.
Eleanor Mildred Sidgwick. (1917). Review: The Reality of Psychic Phenomena: Raps, Levitation etc. By W. J. Crawford. Journal of the Society for Psychical Research 18: 29–31.

1898 births
Irish fraudsters
Irish spiritual mediums
People from Belfast
Psychokineticists
Year of death missing